BRK is an interrupt in 65xx processors.

BRK may also refer to:

"brk" and sbrk, Unix system calls
B-R-K, a Semitic root of given name Barak
BRK.A and BRK.B, NYSE symbols of Berkshire Hathaway
BRK Brands, US, retail brand First Alert
 Berkshire, county in England, Chapman code
Brioche-knit stitch in brioche knitting
Birgid language, ISO 639-3 language code
Briansk State Air Enterprise, see List of airline codes (B)
Bourke Airport, NSW, Australia, IATA airport code
Berwick railway station (East Sussex), a railway station in Sussex, England
Marijan Brkić Brk, a Croatian guitarist
PTK6, or BRK, breast tumor kinase
Belgrade Rugby Club